Satan's Princess is a 1990 film directed by Bert I. Gordon and starring Robert Forster and Lydie Denier.

Plot
The title character is the head of a modeling agency for women, and who has hired a runaway girl to help her. A police officer goes undercover to find the runaway, but the evil 'princess' catches on to him and the investigation.

Cast
 Robert Forster as Lou Cherney
 Lydie Denier as Nicole St. James
 Caren Kaye as Lea
 Phillip Glasser as Joey
 Michael Harris as Dorian
 Ellen Geer as Mary Kulik
 Rena Riffel as Erica Dunn
 Jack Carter as Old Priest
 Henry Brown as Felson  
 Marlena Giovi as Betty Calabrese 
 Al Pugliese as Sal Calabrese

Production
Satan's Princess went through many titles during production including Heat From Another Sun, Princess of Darkness, and Malediction.

Release
Satan's Princess was released directly to video in the United States.

Reception
In a contemporary review, Variety noted that "mundane performances lift this mundane direct-to-video release", noting that Robert Forster, Lydie Denier, and Caren Kaye all "deserve more challenging assignments than this potboiler."

References

Footnotes

Sources

External links

1990 direct-to-video films
Films directed by Bert I. Gordon
Direct-to-video horror films
1990s English-language films